The Zira FK 2019–20 season was Zira's fifth Azerbaijan Premier League season, and sixth season in their history. Zira finished the season in 5th position and were scheduled to face Gabala in the Azerbaijan Cup semifinals before the season was ended prematurely due to COVID-19 pandemic in Azerbaijan.

Season events
On 8 October, Samir Abbasov left his role as manager of Zira by mutual consent.
On 9 October, Zaur Hashimov was appointed as Zira's new manager until the end of the season.

On 21 December, Zira announced the singing of Aghabala Ramazanov and Davit Volkovi on an 18-month contracts starting from 1 January 2020.

On 11 January, Sony Norde was released by Zira.

On 14 January, Alie Sesay joined Zira on an 18-month contract.

On 21 January, Jovan Krneta returned to Zira, signing until the end of the season.

On 25 January, Gheorghe Anton signed for Zira on an 18-month contract.

On 27 January, Robin Ngalande was released by Zira.

On 29 January, Julio Rodríguez left Zira by mutual consent.

On 2 February, Elvin Mammadov left Zira by mutual consent.

On 3 March, Zira announced the signing of Emil Balayev on a contract until the end of the season.

On 13 March 2020, the Azerbaijan Premier League was postponed due to the COVID-19 pandemic.

On 19 June 2020, the AFFA announced that the 2019–20 season had been officially ended without the resumption of the remains matches due to the escalating situation of the COVID-19 pandemic in Azerbaijan.

Squad

Transfers

In

Loans in

Out

Released

Friendlies

Competitions

Azerbaijan Premier League

Results summary

Results by round

Results

League table

Azerbaijan Cup

Squad statistics

Appearances and goals

|-
|colspan="14"|Players away from Zira on loan:
|-
|colspan="14"|Players who left Zira during the season:

|}

Goal scorers

Clean sheets

Disciplinary record

References

Azerbaijani football clubs 2019–20 season
Zira FK